Claire Anderson is an English radio DJ, television presenter and voice-over artist. She was the presenter of the Sony-nominated The Late Lounge when it was broadcast on Jazz FM, from 2009 until 2016. She now presents it in its streaming-only format. She also remains the station's voice.

Anderson began as a DJ on Whiston Hospital Radio in Prescot, Merseyside. A year later, she joined Rock FM and went on to present radio shows across England, including Ocean FM, Power FM, Wave 105 and BBC Radio Solent (2009–2012).

She became a full-time voice-over artist in 2001, becoming the voice of MTV UK & Ireland shortly thereafter.

She has also presented several television shows — including Channel 4's Scientific Eye, ITV's House of Fun and Channel 5's The Mag — and was a showbiz correspondent for Sky.

Her timeslot on Jazz FM was weekdays from 10pm to midnight.

Personal life
Anderson was educated at Rainford High School in Merseyside, and lives in Southampton.

References

External links
Claire Anderson's official website

Year of birth missing (living people)
Living people
English radio DJs
English television presenters
People from Rainford
Place of birth missing (living people)